The 1998–99 French Rugby Union Championship was played by 24 teams divided in the preliminary phase into three pools of 8. The first five teams from each pool and the best 6th placed were admitted to second round. The other played a relegation tournament divided in two pools.

Toulouse  won the title, beating Montferrand in the final (that lose for 6th time the final).

First round

Béziers and Toulon had both 28 points. The "best 6th" was Toulon due to having less "red Cards" during the season.

Second round 
The first of each pools were qualified to quarter of finals

Grenoble was 2nd due to having less "red cards" during the season .

Quarters of final

Semifinals

Final

Relegation Pools

References

French Rugby Chanmpionship
French rugby union championship
Championship